Valery Martyshev (born 14 March 1964) is a Russian equestrian. He competed in the individual eventing at the 2008 Summer Olympics.

References

1964 births
Living people
Russian male equestrians
Olympic equestrians of Russia
Equestrians at the 2008 Summer Olympics
Sportspeople from Moscow